Vîșcăuți is a village in Orhei District, Moldova.

References

Villages of Orhei District
Populated places on the Dniester